The RPG-1 (Ruchnoy Protivotankovy Granatomyot-1) was a Soviet lightweight anti-tank rocket equipped with a shaped charge warhead. The design was inspired by similar weapons being introduced by the US and Germany in the late-World War II period. Work on the design began in 1944 and continued until 1948, but it was not put into production, as the RPG-2 was selected for this role instead. The RPG-1 introduced the basic physical and mechanical layout that was also used on the RPG-2 and the much more famous and ubiquitous RPG-7.

History
In 1944 the Soviets extensively tested new anti-tank weapons, including the German Panzerfaust and Panzerschreck as well as the US bazooka. They decided to produce their own design combining the best features of all of these, and started development under G.P. Lominskiy at the Main Artillery Directorate's Small Arms and Mortar Research Range.

Initially known as the LPG-44, named after the program's start date, the weapon was intended to be smaller and lighter than the Panzerfaust, but easily reloadable like the bazooka. Development was largely completed by the end of 1944 and the system was renamed the RPG-1 and the round became the PG-1.

However, continued testing ran into a series of problems. A major issue was problems in the firing cap, and that the propellant tended to have inconsistent performance based on temperature changes. It did, however, retain the Panzerfausts low velocity, making it accurate only over perhaps , with a maximum range of only .

Work continued to try to address these issues, but in 1947 a totally new design started that emerged as the RPG-2. This design was clearly superior, and work on the RPG-1 ended in 1948.

Description
The rear  was covered by a thin wooden sheath to protect the operator from the heat of firing. Immediately in front of the sheath was the pistol grip firing trigger, and in front of that a cocking lever. A leaf sight flipped forward and up from the top of the tube above the trigger. Sighting was taken by comparing range markings on the leaf sight against the outermost portion of the round, a solution also used on the Panzerfaust. The empty launcher weighed only .

The PG-70 was inserted into the muzzle of the launcher and fired using a simple percussion cap firing a  cartridge. Three ring-shaped stabilising fins were mounted on a tube that extended down the outside of barrel of the launcher, avoiding the need for flip-out fins or other solutions that would fit inside the barrel. A trained two-man crew could fire 4 to 6 rounds per minute.

References

Citations

Bibliography
 

Rocket-propelled grenade launchers of the Soviet Union
Trial and research firearms of the Soviet Union
Abandoned military projects of the Soviet Union